Linus Andersson (born 30 April 1999) is a Swedish ice hockey player. He is currently playing with HC Vita Hästen of Hockeyallsvenskan.

Career
Andersson's career began with Skellefteå AIK where he played on the U16, U18 and U20 junior teams. In 2013–14, he debuted at the under-16 level, playing three games in the J16 SM. In 2015–16 he dressed for 21 U-18 games, recording eleven goals and six assists. The following season he dressed for his first U-20 games. After impressive performances in the youth ranks, Andersson made his Swedish Hockey League debut against Växjö Lakers.

References

External links

1999 births
Living people
People from Arvidsjaur Municipality
Skellefteå AIK players
Swedish ice hockey forwards
Sportspeople from Norrbotten County